Bradford Perkins (March 6, 1925 – June 29, 2008) was an American historian who spent the bulk of his career at the University of Michigan.  He was the son of the historian Dexter Perkins.

Life
Perkins was born in Rochester, New York, in 1925, where his father was a professor at the University of Rochester.  He served in the U.S. Army during World War II in the European theater.  He received his A.B. in 1947 from Harvard University, and completed his doctoral work there in 1952 under the direction of Frederick Merk.

Perkins taught at the University of California, Los Angeles.  He joined the University of Michigan history department in 1962 and retired in 1997.   He was Professor Emeritus at the  University of Michigan.  He was Commonwealth Fund Lecturer at University College London.

Honors and awards
 1962 Guggenheim Fellowship
 1965 Bancroft Prize (for Castlereagh and Adams)
 1974 President of the Society for Historians of American Foreign Relations
 1979 delivered the Albert Shaw Lectures on Diplomatic History at Johns Hopkins University
 1984-1994 member, Department of State Advisory Committee on Historical Diplomatic Documentation
 Elected to the Society of American Historians
 Elected Fellow of the Massachusetts Historical Society
 Elected to the American Antiquarian Society

Works
"Impressions of Wartime," The Journal of American History, September 1990
"Interests, Values, and the Prism: The Sources of American Foreign Policy", Journal of the Early Republic, 1994
The First Rapprochement: England and the United States, 1795-1805 (1955)
Prologue to war, England and the United States, 1805-1812 (1961)full text online
Castlereagh and Adams: England and the United States, 1812-1823 (1964)
England and the United States (1967)
The Great Rapprochement: England and the United States, 1895-1914 (1968, reprinted 2003)
The Creation of a Republican Empire, 1776-1865 (Volume 1 of the Cambridge History of American Foreign Relations, ed. Warren I. Cohen)(1995)

References

External links
"ORAL HISTORY OF BRADFORD PERKINS", University of Michigan, JASON R. GLASS, March 14,1999

20th-century American historians
20th-century American male writers
Harvard University alumni
Writers from Rochester, New York
University of Michigan faculty
United States Army personnel of World War II
1925 births
2008 deaths
Historians of American foreign relations
Historians from New York (state)
Bancroft Prize winners
American male non-fiction writers